Gregory Carigeiet (born 8 March 1987) is a Swiss luger who has competed since 1999.

Carigeit finished 17th in the men's singles event at a World Cup event in Calgary on 21 November 2009. Carigeiet has finished 15th at the FIL World Luge Championships in 2007, 2011, and 2012.

References

External links 
 
 
 

1987 births
Living people
Swiss male lugers
Olympic lugers of Switzerland
Lugers at the 2014 Winter Olympics